Darren Lee Maddy (born 23 May 1974) is an English former professional cricketer who played for Leicestershire and Warwickshire County Cricket Clubs and for the England cricket team. Maddy made three Test match, eight One Day International (ODI) and four Twenty20 International (T20I) appearances for England and played domestic county cricket for 20 years.

Maddy was born at Leicester in 1974 and educated at Wreake Valley College.

Domestic career
Maddy left school to join Leicestershire aged 17 and made his senior debut for the county towards the end of the 1993 English cricket season in a one-day match against Derbyshire at Grace Road. He made his first-class cricket debut the following season and played regularly for Leicestershire between 1995 and 2006. He was awarded his county cap in 1996 and won the County Championship with the side in 1996 and 1998 and the Twenty20 Cup in 2004 and 2006. After being awarded a benefit season by Leicestershire in 2006 he left the club at the end of the season to join Warwickshire.

After just one game for Warwickshire he became captain of the team following Heath Streak's resignation, captaining the side until the end of the 2008 season. He led Warwickshire to the County Championship Division Two title in 2008 and won the County Championship with the side in 2012 as well as the Yorkshire Bank 40 in 2010. He played for the county until the end of the 2013 season, announcing his retirement from cricket part way through the season.

Maddy scored over 13,000 runs and took more than 250 wickets in first-class county matches during his domestic career as well as scoring over 9,000 runs and taking over 220 wickets in one-day county cricket. He was the first player to score 1,000 runs in Twenty20 cricket. After retirement he became a teacher at Solihull School.

International career
Maddy played three Test matches and eight ODIs for England between 1998 and 2000. He made his international debut in an ODI against South Africa at The Oval in May 1998 and his Test debut on the same ground against New Zealand in August 1999. His Test and ODI career was described as "brief and not especially successful" and although he scored a half-century in his final ODI against Zimbabwe in early 2000, Wisden was of the opinion that he had "failed to make the impact hoped".

After not being considered for international duty for seven years, Maddy was selected for England's squad for the 2007 ICC World Twenty20, the country's selectors opting to select a team of T20 specialists. He played four matches during the tournament, scoring a half-century and taking three wickets, his only international wickets.

Coaching career
In May 2022, Maddy was named as the coach of the Croatia national cricket team, ahead of their ICC Men's T20 World Cup Europe Qualifier matches in Finland in July 2022.

References

External links
 

1974 births
Living people
English cricketers
England One Day International cricketers
England Test cricketers
England Twenty20 International cricketers
Leicestershire cricketers
Warwickshire cricketers
Warwickshire cricket captains
Cricketers from Leicester
ICL World XI cricketers
Royal Bengal Tigers cricketers
NBC Denis Compton Award recipients
First-Class Counties Select XI cricketers